Orange is the fourth studio album by the Jon Spencer Blues Explosion. It was released through Matador Records on October 12, 1994. The Village Voice ranked the album #16 of the top albums of 1994. NME named it the 16th best album of 1994. In 2018, Paste named it the 48th best garage rock album of all time. The single "Bellbottoms" was included in The Pitchfork 500.

Critical reception

Michele Romero of Entertainment Weekly gave the album a grade of B, saying, "The resulting cross between rock & roll and insanity can be thrilling in its fervency; it can also be as boring as a band warming up before the show." Tom Breihan of Pitchfork gave the album an 8.6 out of 10, calling it "an absurd burst of swagger and libido, as rendered by three total expert musicians." Thom Jurek of AllMusic gave the album 4 stars out of 5, saying, "Orange is almost entirely new sonic terrain -- but it keeps the trio's trademark sweaty, musical terrorism and hedonistic rage up front."

In popular culture

'Bellbottoms' notably featured in the opening of the 2017 film Baby Driver directed by Edgar Wright.

Track listing

References

External links
 

1994 albums
Jon Spencer Blues Explosion albums
Matador Records albums
Mute Records albums
Au Go Go Records albums
Funk albums by American artists